Juho Keränen (born April 7, 1985) is a Finnish professional ice hockey player. He is currently playing for HIFK of the Finnish Liiga.

Keränen made his SM-liiga debut playing with Oulun Kärpät during the 2005–06 SM-liiga season.

References

External links

1985 births
Living people
People from Keitele
Finnish ice hockey forwards
Oulun Kärpät players
HPK players
Lukko players
HIFK (ice hockey) players
Sportspeople from North Savo